In Greek mythology, Hyrtacus (Ancient Greek: Ὕρτακος) is an obscure character associated with the Trojan War. He was a comrade of King Priam of Troy. Hyrtacus married Arisbe, daughter of King Merops of Percote, after Priam had divorced her to marry Hecabe. Hyrtacus's son by Arisbe was named Asius and fought at Troy. In the Aeneid, Hyrtacus is credited with two more sons, Nisus and Hippocoon. Hyrtacus's own parentage is not given.

The name 'Hyrtacus' is perhaps of Cretan origin, given that there was an ancient city named Hyrtacus (or Hyrtacina) in southwestern Crete.

Notes

Trojans

References 

 Apollodorus, The Library with an English Translation by Sir James George Frazer, F.B.A., F.R.S. in 2 Volumes, Cambridge, MA, Harvard University Press; London, William Heinemann Ltd. 1921. ISBN 0-674-99135-4. Online version at the Perseus Digital Library. Greek text available from the same website.
 Homer, The Iliad with an English Translation by A.T. Murray, Ph.D. in two volumes. Cambridge, MA., Harvard University Press; London, William Heinemann, Ltd. 1924. . Online version at the Perseus Digital Library.
 Homer, Homeri Opera in five volumes. Oxford, Oxford University Press. 1920. . Greek text available at the Perseus Digital Library.
 Publius Vergilius Maro, Aeneid. Theodore C. Williams. trans. Boston. Houghton Mifflin Co. 1910. Online version at the Perseus Digital Library.
 Publius Vergilius Maro, Bucolics, Aeneid, and Georgics. J. B. Greenough. Boston. Ginn & Co. 1900. Latin text available at the Perseus Digital Library.